Russian Expeditionary Force may refer to:

Expeditionary forces sent by Russia
 Russian Expeditionary Force in France; a World War I military expedition of the Russian Empire
 Russian Legion; the remains of the unit as a volunteer internationalist force after the withdrawal of Russia from WWI

Expeditionary forces sent to Russia
 Allied intervention in the Russian Civil War
 American Expeditionary Force, North Russia; a World War I military expedition of the United States of America
 American Expeditionary Force, Siberia; a World War I military expedition of the United States of America
 Canadian Siberian Expeditionary Force; a World War I military expedition of Canada

See also
 Expeditionary warfare
 Expeditionary Force (disambiguation)
 Russia
 Invasion of Russia (disambiguation)
 Russian invasion (disambiguation)
 Soviet invasion (disambiguation)

Expeditionary units and formations
Military history of Russia